Dante Bertoli (28 January 1913 – 11 September 1996) was an Italian wrestler. He competed in the men's Greco-Roman bantamweight at the 1936 Summer Olympics.

References

External links
 

1913 births
1996 deaths
Italian male sport wrestlers
Olympic wrestlers of Italy
Wrestlers at the 1936 Summer Olympics
People from Sassuolo
Sportspeople from the Province of Modena
20th-century Italian people